The Ennerdale Horseshoe Fell Race is an annual Lake District fell race held in June, starting and finishing at the Scout Camp near Ennerdale Water.

History

The race was started in 1968 by Joe Long and Frank Travis of the West Cumberland Orienteering Club and in 1970 was taken on by the newly formed Cumberland Fell Runners Association, whose committee included both Long and Travis. The first nine editions of the race were all won by Joss Naylor who has noted that it was one of his favourite courses.

A junior race was run in conjunction with Ennerdale in 1971. This followed the first part of the senior course over Great Borne and Red Pike before returning and was won by Dave Cannon. In the following years, the junior race was held on a route over Crag Fell and in 1977 a ladies’ race was introduced, also over the Crag Fell route.

Véronique Marot applied to run over the same course as the men in 1979 but was refused entry. She ran unofficially, to the consternation of the race organiser. The next year, women were allowed to compete over the full route.

In poor weather in the 1981 race, one of the competitors, Bob English, went off course on the way to the last checkpoint and fell badly. He was found unconscious with head injuries and died whilst being taken to hospital.

In the 1986 event, Billy Bland waited at the start until five minutes after everyone else had begun so that the other runners could not follow him and take advantage of his detailed route knowledge. Bland then ran through the field and was able to overtake everyone except Hugh Symonds.

The 2003 race was cancelled due to the small number of entries. Around that time, the event became part of the Lakeland Classics Trophy series of races and numbers recovered in subsequent years.

On some occasions, Ennerdale has been one of the counting races in the British and English Fell Running Championships, including in 2014 when a shorter lower-level course was used due to forecast lightning. The 2015 route was also shortened due to high winds and in 2022 the race was cancelled due to expected adverse weather.

Results

The men's course record is held by Kenny Stuart with a time of 3:20:57 set in 1985. The fastest women's time is 4:01:33, set by Janet McIver in 2008.

The winners have been as follows.

 Crag Fell course.

 Bad weather course.

 The SPORTident results show Nicky Spinks one second ahead of Kirsty Hewitson but they were credited with a joint win in a time of 5:32:54 by race organiser Colin Dulson.

References

Fell running competitions in Cumbria